XHTEC-FM is a radio station serving Monterrey, Nuevo León. Branded as Tec Sounds Radio, it is owned by the Monterrey Institute of Technology and Higher Education and broadcasts on 94.9 FM from its Monterrey campus.

References

Radio stations in Monterrey
University radio stations in Mexico
Radio stations established in 1998